José María Asensio (1829–1905) was a Spanish historian, journalist, biographer and writer.

Works
The Conde de Lemos, protector of Cervantes, 1880.
New documents to illustrate the life of Miguel de Cervantes Saavedra, Sevilla, 1864.
Cervantes and his works. Articles., Barcelona: F. Seix, 1902.
Don Pedro I of Castile, his reign, his character
Christopher Columbus, his life, his travels
The remains of Christopher Columbus are in Havana. Proof by José María Asensio. Sevilla: Printing and Spanish and Foreign Bookseller D. Rafael Tarascó and Lasa, 1881.
Martin Alonso Pinzon: Madrid historical study: Modern Spain, 1892.
Francisco Pacheco : artistic and literary works especially true book description and memorable portraits of illustrious men, who left unpublished: notes that may serve as an introduction to this book if it ever gets published (Sevilla: Lithography and bookstore Spanish and Foreign José M ª Geofrin, 1867 and Seville: Francisco Alvarez and C ª, printers, 1876)
Fernan Caballero : biographical study. Madrid: Modern Spain, 1900.
The interpretations of Don Quixote.
Note some books, articles and pamphlets on the life and works of Miguel de Cervantes Saavedra Seville: [sn], 1885 (Imp of E. Rasco)
An eighteenth-century Portuguese cervantista burned by the Holy Office of the Inquisition: biographical notes, Seville: [sn], 1885 (Imp of E. Rasco)
Hercules: Conde de Montesquieu poem. Seville: [sn], 1878 (Imp of Gironés and Orduña)
Cervantes and his works: literary letters, directed at various friends, Seville: [sn], 1870 (Imp that was José María Geofrin)
Catalog of some books, pamphlets and loose items relating to life and to the works of Miguel de Cervantes ..., Sevilla: Printing and Rafael Library Tarascó and Lassa, 1872
Liceo Seville: speech read by the Vice-President Mr. D. Honorary José María Asensio in the inaugural session ... Seville: [sn], 1875 (Francisco Alvarez and Ca, Printers)
Pictures of Spanish, taken in fac-simile, old editions of his works: first series 1563–1701 ... Seville: [sn], 1869 (Henry Litogr. Utrera)
Speeches read before the Royal Academy of Fine Arts Sevillana the 23 April 1871, Sevilla: Imp and Bookstore, Sierpes Street, 35 old, modern 73, 1871.

Spanish male writers
Members of the Royal Spanish Academy
1829 births
1905 deaths